In the city of Comodoro Rivadavia in the south of Argentina, we can find an important and picturesque elevation which divides the town in two, the Chenque hill. The city business district area lies at the foot of the hill. Its summit reaches 212 m above sea level and the panoramic view from the top is amazing.

According to researchers the name “Chenque” belongs to language of the “native Pehuenche” and some possible meanings are:

• Native cemetery or burial.
• Rock house or cave in hard rock (in which they buried the dead)
• Funeral knoll formed with rocks.

Legend says that any person who digs objects from the Chenque hill, cemetery of the old aborigines, will get 100-year punishment for them and their family. Apparently those who have taken out arrows, bones and pots died soon or remained damned.

It is also said that any person who visits the Chenque hill and rubs their hands with its clay and sandy dust will return to the region. It is because they will receive a call from the spirit of natives buried there.

At the moment the Chenque hill is a reason of concern for its slips, mainly in the so-called area "Infiernillo" (literally Little Hell).

Landforms of Chubut Province
Landforms of Argentina